Igor Sedašev (born 21 July 1950 in Tallinn) is an Estonian politician. He was a member of VIII Riigikogu.

References

Living people
1950 births
Members of the Riigikogu, 1995–1999
Estonian people of Russian descent
Politicians from Tallinn